Alma Marina Vitela Rodríguez (born 26 December 1965) is a Mexican nurse and politician, a member of the Morena party. She most recently served as the mayor of Gómez Palacio, Durango, and is running for Governor of Durango in the state election to be held in June 2022.

Early life
Vitela was born into a family with seven siblings and was orphaned at a young age.

Political career
Vitela received a technical nursing degree in 1984 and worked as a nurse in the ISSSTE and IMSS systems and for the Mexican Red Cross; while a nurse, she also was a labor union representative in multiple ISSSTE facilities. Her first political posts came as a member of the Partido Revolucionario Institucional (PRI); she served two nonconsecutive terms as a state deputy to the Congress of Durango, from 2001 to 2004 and 2007 to 2010. During the latter term, she concurrently served as a director of the National PRI Women's Organization (ONMPRI). She also was the secretary general, the second-highest position in the PRI in Durango, from 2009 to 2012, coinciding with a two-year stint as Gómez Palacio city councilor.

Vitela was elected as a federal deputy to the LXII Legislature of the Mexican Congress in 2012. She was a secretary on the Health Commission and also sat on commissions for Metropolitan Development, Social Security, and Special Commission for Social Programs. After her three-year term, she returned to the Durango state legislature from 2016 to 2018.

Vitela changed parties from the PRI to Morena in 2018. That year, Gómez Palacio voters reelected her to the Chamber of Deputies, where she would be part of the first six months of the LXV Legislature of the Mexican Congress. She resigned from the federal legislature in March 2019 in order to run for mayor of Gómez Palacio, winning election and serving from 2019 to 2021. She was the first non-PRI mayor of the city.

In November 2021, Vitela resigned as mayor in order to pursue the Morena nomination for Governor of Durango in the 2022 state elections. The party selected her from among six contenders for the nomination the next month.

Personal life
Vitela has three children.

References

Morena (political party) politicians
Deputies of the LXIV Legislature of Mexico
Deputies of the LXII Legislature of Mexico
1965 births
Living people
Members of the Chamber of Deputies (Mexico) for Durango
Municipal presidents in Durango